Claude Rabuel (1669 – 1729) was a French Jesuit mathematician. He analyzed Descartes's Géométrie.

Rabuel was professor at the Collège de la Trinité in Lyon.

Works 
  From Biblioteca europea di informazione e cultura
  From Internet Archive

References

1669 births
1729 deaths
18th-century French Jesuits
18th-century French mathematicians